The South Pole–Aitken basin (SPA Basin) is an immense impact crater on the far side of the Moon. It is the largest, oldest, and deepest basin recognized on the Moon. It is estimated that it was formed 4.2 to 4.3 billion years ago, during the Pre-Nectarian epoch. It was named for two features on opposite sides of the basin: the lunar South Pole at one end and the crater Aitken on the northern end. The outer rim of this basin can be seen from Earth as a huge mountain chain located on the Moon's southern limb, sometimes informally called "Leibnitz mountains".

On 3 January 2019, the Chang'e 4, a Chinese spacecraft, landed in the basin, specifically within a crater called Von Kármán. In May 2019, scientists announced that a large mass of material had been identified deep within the crater.

Discovery 

The existence of a giant far side basin was suspected as early as 1962 based on early Soviet probe images (namely Luna 3 and Zond 3), but it was not until wide-field photographs taken by the US Lunar Orbiter program became available in 1966-7 that geologists recognized its true size. Laser altimeter data obtained during the Apollo 15 and 16 missions showed that the northern portion of this basin was very deep, but since these data were only available along the near-equatorial ground tracks of the orbiting command and service modules, the topography of the rest of the basin remained unknown. The geologic map showing the northern half of this basin and with its edge depicted was published in 1978 by the United States Geological Survey. Little was known about the basin until the 1990s, when the spacecraft Galileo and Clementine visited the Moon. Multispectral images obtained from these missions showed that this basin contains more FeO and TiO2 than typical lunar highlands, and hence has a darker appearance. The topography of the basin was mapped in its entirety for the first time using altimeter data and the analysis of stereo image pairs taken during the Clementine mission. Most recently, the composition of this basin has been further constrained by the analysis of data obtained from a gamma-ray spectrometer that was on board the Lunar Prospector mission.

Physical characteristics 

The South Pole–Aitken basin is the largest, deepest and oldest basin recognized on the Moon. The lowest elevations of the Moon (about −6000 m) are located within the South Pole–Aitken basin, and the highest peaks (about +8000 m) are found on this basin's north-eastern rim, which are sometimes called the Leibnitz Mountains. Because of this basin's great size, the crust at this locale is expected to be thinner than typical as a result of the large amount of material that was excavated due to an impact. Crustal thickness maps constructed using the Moon's topography and gravity field imply a thickness of about 30 km beneath the floor of this basin, in comparison to 60–80 km around it and the global average of about 50 km.

The composition of the basin, as estimated from the Galileo, Clementine, and Lunar Prospector missions, appears to be different from typical highland regions. Most importantly, none of the samples obtained from the American Apollo and Russian Luna missions, nor the handful of identified lunar meteorites, have comparable compositions. The orbital data indicate that the floor of the basin has slightly elevated abundances of iron, titanium, and thorium. In terms of mineralogy, the basin floor is much richer in clinopyroxene and orthopyroxene than the surrounding highlands, which are largely anorthositic. Several possibilities exist for this distinctive chemical signature: one is that it might simply represent lower crustal materials that are somewhat richer in iron, titanium and thorium than the upper crust; another is that the composition reflects the widespread distribution of ponds of iron-rich basalts, similar to those that make up the lunar maria; alternatively, the rocks in the basin could contain a component from the lunar mantle if the basin excavated all the way through the crust; and, finally, it is possible that a large portion of the lunar surface surrounding the basin was melted during the impact event, and differentiation of this impact melt sheet could have given rise to additional geochemical anomalies. Complicating the matter is the possibility that several processes have contributed to the basin's anomalous geochemical signature. Ultimately, the origin of the anomalous composition of the basin is not known with certainty and will likely require a sample return mission to determine.

Origin 

Simulations of near vertical impacts show that the bolide ought to have excavated vast amounts of mantle materials from depths as great as 200 km below the surface. However, observations thus far do not favor a mantle composition for this basin and crustal thickness maps seem to indicate the presence of about 10 kilometers of crustal materials beneath this basin's floor. This has suggested to some that the basin was not formed by a typical high-velocity impact, but may instead have been formed by a low-velocity projectile around 200 km in diameter (compare to the 10 km diameter Chicxulub impactor) that hit at a low angle (about 30 degrees or less), and hence did not dig very deeply into the Moon. Putative evidence for this comes from the high elevations north-east of the rim of the South Pole–Aitken basin that might represent ejecta from such an oblique impact. The impact theory would also account for magnetic anomalies on the Moon.

See also 

 Geology of the Moon
 Lunar craters
 Lunar water

References

Further reading

External links 

 Albedo, Topography, and Mineral Concentrations
 Searching for water in the Aitken Basin
 The Clementine Mission found ice in the Aitken Basin while mapping southern lunar region

Geological features on the Moon
Impact craters on the Moon
Pre-Nectarian